Asthenocormus is an extinct genus of pachycormiform ray-finned fish. A member of the edentulous suspension feeding clade within the Pachycormiformes, fossils have been found in the Upper Jurassic plattenkalks of Bavaria, Germany.

See also

 Prehistoric fish
 List of prehistoric bony fish

References

Middle Jurassic fish
Late Jurassic fish
Pachycormiformes
Jurassic fish of Europe